Ajni railway station (station code:- AJNI) is a railway station in vicinity of Nagpur in Maharashtra on Delhi–Chennai line.

It is situated at a distance of about 2.8 km from Nagpur railway station. There are plans to develop it as a terminus alternative to Nagpur. A proposal has also been sent to Railway Ministry to develop it as a Coaching complex.

Many trains have a brief stop of about 2 minutes at this station. This station is mainly used by residents of Central, West, South-West and Southern suburbs of Nagpur and short-distance daily travelers. Trains terminating at Nagpur get almost 80 percent emptied here. And trains originating from Nagpur get filled here with almost 40 percent.

Ajni is among the five small stations which falls within the extended city limits of Nagpur. The name of these five stations are Ajni, Kamptee & Khapri.

Loco Shed
Electric Loco Shed, Ajni holding 260+ locomotives like WAP-7, WAG-7, WAG-9 and WAG-12.
It is currently holding 66 WAP-7, 49 WAG-7, 160+ WAG-9 and 26 WAG-12 locomotives.

Service
Lokmanya Tilak Terminus–Ajni Express
Pune–Ajni AC Superfast Express
Amravati–Ajni Intercity Express
 Ajni–Kazipet Passenger

Gallery

References

Railway stations in Nagpur district
Transport in Nagpur
Nagpur CR railway division